Andreas Eriksen (22 September 1915 – 17 August 1976) was a Norwegian novelist.

He was born in Kristiania. His debut novel was the boy's book Fire gutter drar nordover (1935). The novels Etterpå gikk vi hjem (1936) and Promenade (1937), followed; both about school or student life. In 1941 he released the short story collection Utkant. During the occupation of Norway by Nazi Germany he was arrested in January 1944. He was imprisoned in Bredtveit concentration camp until February, Grini concentration camp until July, then Berg concentration camp until 20 October 1944.

References

1915 births
1976 deaths
Norwegian male short story writers
Norwegian resistance members
Bredtveit concentration camp survivors
Grini concentration camp survivors
Berg concentration camp survivors
20th-century Norwegian novelists
20th-century Norwegian short story writers
20th-century Norwegian male writers